Arely Gómez González (born 9 November 1952) is a Mexican attorney and Institutional Revolutionary Party (PRI) politician. A lawyer by profession, Gonzalez served as Mexico's Secretary of Civil Service after 18 months as the country's Attorney General, both during the government of Enrique Peña Nieto. Gonzalez was a Senator of the LXII Legislature of the Mexican Congress.

References

1952 births
Living people
People from Mexico City
Women members of the Senate of the Republic (Mexico)
Members of the Senate of the Republic (Mexico)
Institutional Revolutionary Party politicians
21st-century Mexican politicians
21st-century Mexican women politicians
Attorneys general of Mexico
Female justice ministers
Women Secretaries of State of Mexico
Universidad Anáhuac México alumni